Tim League is an American entrepreneur and film producer based in Austin, Texas. He is the founder of the Alamo Drafthouse Cinema chain and the founder of the film distribution company Drafthouse Films, where League has produced films including The ABCs of Death. He is also the co-founder of genre film festival Fantastic Fest, the entertainment merchandise entity Mondo, and the film distribution and production company Neon.

Alamo Drafthouse
League graduated from Rice University in 1992 with degrees in Mechanical Engineering and Art/Art History. While at Rice, Tim was once detained by the campus police for interrupting a campus event while dressed as a banana. After a two-year stint at Shell Oil Company in Bakersfield, California, he left the engineering profession and opened up his first movie theater. An unmitigated financial disaster, the Tejon theater closed in 1995, and he loaded a truck with 200 seats, a projector, screen and speakers and headed to Austin, Texas to start the Alamo Drafthouse Cinema, where he remained as CEO until 2020 when he was replaced by Shelli Taylor. He then took up a new position as chairman of the board.

When asked about his motivation in opening a movie theater in the first place, "What we set out to do in the very beginning was to make a movie theater by fans for fans. And we got into the business because we love movies and we got a little frustrated with our options as to what the movie theater experience was all about".

Rolling Roadshow
League founded the Rolling Roadshow, which takes classic films around the country to project them at the sites they were set in.

Mondo
In 2004, League co-founded entertainment merchandiser Mondo to produce and distribute limited-edition poster art, t-shirts, toys, and vinyl record soundtracks.

Fantastic Fest

In 2005, Tim League, Harry Knowles, Paul Alvarado-Dykstra, and Tim McCanlies co-founded Fantastic Fest, the largest genre film festival in the United States. Held annually at the Alamo Drafthouse South Lamar in Austin, Texas, the festival focuses on such genres as horror, science fiction, fantasy, action, Asian, and cult. In 2007, Variety publisher Charles Koones included Fantastic Fest as one of "ten festivals we love". In 2008, MovieMaker magazine named Fantastic Fest "one of the 25 film festivals worth the entry fee".

The 2017 festival attracted attention whenit was disclosed that League had rehired Devin Faraci as a writer even though Faraci had resigned from Birth.Movies.Death in 2016 after being accused of sexual assault. Faraci's rehiring prompted the resignation of Todd Brown, Fantastic Fest's director of international programming. Fantastic Fest subsequently severed ties with Harry Knowles after sexual harassment and assault allegations were levied against him. Alamo Drafthouse nevertheless proceeded with plans to show a previously unreleased pornographic film by Ed Wood.

Drafthouse Films
In 2010, League founded the film distribution and production company known as Drafthouse Films.

Neon
In 2017, League co-founded distribution and production company Neon (stylized as "NEON") with entertainment executive Tom Quinn. Neon's films, including Parasite and I, Tonya, have won several Academy Awards.

Criticism
In 2017, concurrent with the revelations regarding Devin Faraci and Harry Knowles's harassment of women, former Alamo Drafthouse employees alleged that they had complained to League and his wife Karrie about Knowles in previous years. They were told simply to "avoid" Knowles. These purported incidents go as far back as 2000. In late September 2017, League issued a statement apologizing on his and Karrie's behalf "To the women we have let down..."

References

External links

Culture of Austin, Texas
Rice University alumni
Shell plc people
Theatre owners
American film producers
Living people
Year of birth missing (living people)